The Central and southern Appalachian montane oak forest is a forest system found in the Appalachian Mountains of West Virginia, Virginia, Kentucky, Tennessee, North Carolina, South Carolina, and Georgia. 

Soils are thin, weathered, nutrient-poor, low in organic matter, and acidic. Trees are often stunted and wind-flagged.

Flora
The Central and southern Appalachian montane oak forest commonly includes: the Northern red oak (Quercus rubra) and white oak (Quercus alba), and sprouts of American chestnut (Castanea dentata). 

Common shrubs include: Winterberry (Ilex montana), flame azalea (Rhododendron calendulaceum), catawba rhododendron (Rhododendron catawbiense), and great rhododendron (Rhododendron maximum).

See also
Appalachian temperate rainforest
Southern Appalachian spruce-fir forest

References

Forests of the United States
Plant communities of West Virginia
Plant communities of Virginia
Plant communities of Kentucky
Plant communities of Tennessee
Plant communities of North Carolina
Plant communities of South Carolina
Plant communities of Georgia (U.S. state)
Natural history of the Great Smoky Mountains
Appalachian forests